Edward Bodden Airfield , also known as Little Cayman Airport, is an airfield on the southwest side of Little Cayman, one of the Cayman Islands.

The runway parallels the south shoreline, and approach and departures are over the water. Runway length includes a  displaced threshold on Runway 28.

Little Cayman Airport's other main building, a 75-foot (23-metre) free span airplane hangar located directly across the field from Bodden Terminal, was built in 1970 by Ryan Construction of Cayman Brac for Dolphin Limited under the direction of General Manager Richard Bennett.

Airlines and destinations

Cayman Airways Express serves the airport with de Havilland Canada DHC-6 Twin Otter commuter twin turboprop aircraft which have STOL capability.

See also

Transport in the Cayman Islands
List of airports in the Cayman Islands

References

External links 
Edward Bodden Airfield Airport at OpenStreetMap

Little Cayman Airport - World Airport Codes

Airports in the Cayman Islands
Little Cayman